The 2021 LendingTree Bowl was a college football bowl game played on December 18, 2021, and televised on ESPN. It was the 23rd edition of the LendingTree Bowl, and was one of the 2021–22 bowl games concluding the 2021 FBS football season. Online lending marketplace LendingTree was the game's title sponsor. This was the first LendingTree bowl to be played at Hancock Whitney Stadium, following 22 editions at Ladd–Peebles Stadium.

Originally scheduled to kickoff at 5:45 p.m. EST (4:45 p.m. local CST), the start of the game was pushed back 15 minutes due to local weather conditions. Liberty defeated Eastern Michigan, 56–20, to claim their third consecutive bowl victory.

Teams
This will be the second meeting between Eastern Michigan and Liberty; the Flames defeated the Eagles (then known as the Hurons), 25–24, in Ypsilanti, Michigan, on October 14, 1989.

Liberty Flames

Eastern Michigan Eagles

Game summary

Statistics

References

External links
Game statistics at statbroadcast.com

LendingTree Bowl
LendingTree Bowl
Eastern Michigan Eagles football bowl games
Liberty Flames football bowl games
LendingTree Bowl
LendingTree Bowl